Zero Waste Week is an environmental campaign to reduce landfill waste, and takes place annually during the first full week in September. It is a non-commercial grass-roots campaign to demonstrate means and methods to reduce waste, foster community support and bring awareness to the increasing problem of environmental waste and pollution.

Aims
The aim of Zero Waste Week is reduce landfill waste, increase recycling and encourage people to participate in the circular economy. A Zero Waste Week campaign runs predominantly on social media and the internet and aim to reach people who want to reduce their household or business waste, reuse or recycle materials.

Zero Waste week actively encourages people to reduce the use of synthetic materials and plastic packaging, and promotes plastic reuse and conscientious recycling to reduce the amount of waste sent to landfill or for incineration. Zero Waste week adopts the adage there’s no such place as away meaning when we throw something away, it goes somewhere else, often causing harm or toxicity to the eco-system. The campaign's main directive is to bring awareness to people that we are all individually and collectively responsible for what we consume and that the short time of usefulness is only a small part of the overall lifecycle of any product.

Zero Waste Week's long term goals are to create long term change in people's habits, including generating more demand for sustainable products, to lobby producers, and governmental decision makers, and to bring awareness for the need of good custodianship to the upcoming generation.

Events

An online campaign runs during Zero Waste Week, and events organized by different groups take place in London, Scotland, New York, Hong Kong, and others.
Local and national events are held annually where participants and communities make a concerted effort to demonstrate that household, business and industrial waste can be eliminated or reduced.

Challenges 
During Zero Waste Week people are challenged to meet different goals, for example repairing clothes or sewing to combat disposable fashion, or to reduce their weekly waste so that it can fit in a jam jar.

History
Zero Waste week was founded by Rachelle Strauss in 2008 and began as a national campaign in the United Kingdom. The term Zero Waste Week is now used by many organisations, groups and individuals not connected to the original campaign. Strauss first became interested in zero waste after being affected by the Boscastle flood of 2004, a freak weather event that event that she saw as the result of manmade climate change. In September 2008 Strauss launched the first Zero Waste Week with an internet campaign from her blog, to persuade people to reduce, reuse and recycle waste. In September 2013 a new website was setup for  Zero Waste Week, and by 2017 people from seventy-three countries had taken part. In 2018 Zero Waste Week reached its ten year milestone. Many countries run their own Zero Waste Week campaign in co-ordination with the original Zero Waste week or independently.

Awards and recognition 

In 2015 the UK's parliament passed an early day motion to celebrate Zero Waste Week. Founder Rachelle Strauss received the Points Of Light award in September 2018 from the UK government for her work on Zero Waste Week.

Society and culture
Zero Waste Week was described in the National Geographic Documentary Naked Science Series: ‘Surviving Nature’s Fury’ 2005 and in the film Trashed.

Other campaigns for Zero Waste Week
The term Zero Waste Week has been gradually adopted by other campaigns and organisations to run a week of events and activities, often with focus on specific current sustainability issues.

National Marine Sanctuaries
Students for Zero Waste Week is a school-driven, week-long campaign to reduce waste on school campuses and within local communities and started in the year 2015/2016.

Harvard University 
During Earth Week 2014, Harvard University's Gutman Café held a zero waste week during which it tried to divert as much of its trash as possible from the landfill.

Hong Kong Cleanup
Hong Kong Cleanup, a week long campaign of public awareness and on-ground activities.

The Island's Sounder
Orcas Christian School in Eastsound, Washington held Zero Waste Week during the first week of April 2018 with a focus was on sustainability and re-usability.

Emory University
Emory University OSI/RHA Zero Waste Week raises awareness and support for sustainable practices on campus. Students interested in reducing their waste signed up to participate received email reminders and tips about living waste-free.

References

External links
 Zero Waste Week
 Zero Waste International Alliance

Environmental awareness days
Sustainability organizations
Environmental organisations based in the United Kingdom
Week-long observances